Walter Gabriel Pérez (born 23 October 1998) was an Argentine professional footballer who played as a left-back for Huracán. Today he is serving a sentence of 11 years in prison for the crime of sexual abuse.

Career
Pérez, after signing from Proyecto Barcelona, began his senior career with Huracán. The 2018–19 Argentine Primera División season saw the defender promoted into Gustavo Alfaro's first-team squad, with his professional bow arriving on 12 August 2018 during a goalless draw at home to River Plate; he was substituted off in place of Mauro Bogado after seventy-eight minutes.

In December 2019, Pérez was one out of 10 men who got arrested for a gang rape. The incident took place in a rented house in Villa Carlos Paz, which the boys had rented for holidays. A few hours later, all 10, including Peréz' Huracán-teammate Federico Marín, were arrested and jailed for 'doubly aggravated sexual abuse' of a 18-year-old girl. After spending almost 8 months in prison, Peréz was released in September 2020.

Career statistics
.

References

External links

1998 births
Living people
Place of birth missing (living people)
Argentine footballers
Association football defenders
Argentine Primera División players
Club Atlético Huracán footballers